is a former Japanese football player and manager.

Playing career
Sakuma was born in Tokyo on July 7, 1963. After graduating from Komazawa University, he played for NTT Kanto until 1991.

Coaching career
After retirement, Sakuma became coach at NTT Kanto (later Omiya Ardija) in 1991. In August 2007, manager Robert Verbeek was sacked for poor performance when Ardija was at the 16th place of 18 clubs. Sakuma became a new manager as Verbeek successor. He managed until end of the season and Ardija finished at 15th place and remaining in J1 League. In October 2008, he moved to Ventforet Kofu and became a general manager. In August 2011, manager Toshiya Miura was sacked for poor performance. Sakuma became anew manager as Miura successor. However Ventforet results were bad and was relegated to J2. Sakuma returned to general manager from 2012. In May 2015, manager Yasuhiro Higuchi was sacked and Sakuma became a manager again. He managed until end of 2016 season.

Managerial statistics

References

External links

1963 births
Living people
Komazawa University alumni
Association football people from Tokyo
Japanese footballers
Japan Soccer League players
Omiya Ardija players
Japanese football managers
J1 League managers
Omiya Ardija managers
Ventforet Kofu managers
Association football defenders